Fujisankei may refer to:
Fujisankei Communications Group, a Japanese media conglomerate
Fujisankei Communications International, an affiliate of the Fujisankei Communications Group